E 119 is a European B class road in Russia and Azerbaijan, connecting the cities Moscow - Astrakhan - Baku - Makhachkala - Astara, near the border with Iran.

Route 

: (Concurrent with ) Moscow - Kashira
: Kashira - Tambov - Borisoglebsk - Volgograd (Start of Concurrency with ) - Astrakhan (End of Concurrency )
: Astrakhan - Khasavyurt - Mahachkala
: Mahachkala - Kazmalyarskiy - Samur

: Samur - Sumgayit - Baku 
 Bakı Dairəvi Yolu: Baku
: Baku (Start of Concurrency with ) - Ələt (End of Concurrency with ) 
: Ələt  - Biləsuvar - Astara

: Astara

External links 
 UN Economic Commission for Europe: Overall Map of E-road Network (2007)

International E-road network
E119
Roads in Azerbaijan